Shengze is a town in Wujiang District, Suzhou, Jiangsu Province, China.  It is famous for its textile industry.

References

Wujiang District, Suzhou
Township-level divisions of Suzhou